Naagarahaavu is a 1972 Indian Kannada-language film directed by Puttanna Kanagal, based on T. R. Subba Rao's three novels Nagarahavu, Ondu Gandu Eradu Hennu and Sarpa Mathsara, and starring Vishnuvardhan, Aarathi , K. S. Ashwath and Shubha. The supporting cast features Leelavathi, M. Jayashree, M. N. Lakshmi Devi, Ambareesh, Shivaram, Dheerendra Gopal, Lokanath and Vajramuni. The film has a musical score by Vijaya Bhaskar. Cinematography was done by Chittibabu.

The film revolves around the protagonist's relationship with his teacher, Chamayya (K. S. Ashwath). Chamayya, who is childless treats Ramachari (Vishnuvardhan) as his son. He takes it upon himself to guide Ramachari on the right path despite Ramachari's legendary anger. He usually acts as the negotiator between his student and the people who have issues with Ramachari's behaviour. Ramachari is a young man whose anger is his weakness. He is difficult to reason with and has a great deal of pride. Chamayya is the only person who can convince him to do anything. His love interests are Alamelu (Aarathi) and Margaret (Shubha) who play pivotal parts in his life.

The film was released on 29 December 1972 to widespread critical acclaim and was a success in the box office and paved way for the stardom of Vishnuvardhan, Ambareesh and Aarathi who became leading actors in Kannada cinema. The character roles of Leelavathi, Dheerendra Gopal, Loknath, M. N. Lakshmi Devi were also critically acclaimed. The film won eight Karnataka State Film Awards for Second Best Film, Best Actor, Best Actress, Best Supporting Actor, Best Supporting Actress, Best Story, Best Screenplay and Best Dialogue. The film also won two Filmfare Awards South for Best Film – Kannada and a Special Award for excellent performance . This film was remade in Hindi as Zehreela Insaan, directed by Puttanna Kanagal himself and in Tamil as Raja Nagam and Kode Nagu in Telugu.

The film was re-released in its digitized version on 20 July 2018. This movie was digitalized by Balaji who is the brother of V. Ravichandran and son of N. Veeraswamy, who was the producer. The re-release was popular and created a new record of collection.

Plot details

Ramachari 
The story revolves around a short-tempered, yet affable college student named Ramachari in the town of Chitradurga. The story begins with Ramachari being caught in class while trying to copy in an examination and being suspended by the college principal (Loknath). Humiliated and angry, Ramachari throws stones at the principal's house in the night and when the principal wakes up and comes out of his house, ties the half-naked principal to a pole and runs away.

Ramachari is the son of pious parents. His father doesn't like Ramachari because he is unpopular in the town as a ruffian. His mother is worried about his future. One person who cares for Ramachari is his primary school teacher, Chamayya (K.S.Ashwath) master. Ramachari finds the company of Chamayya and his wife Tunga (Leelavathi), more comforting than that of his parents. Ramachari has very great regard for Chamayya master willing to do whatever he says, without thinking.

The next part of the story is about the two women Almelu (Aarathi) and Margaret (Shubha) who come into Ramachari's life and how the teacher Chamayya influences Ramachari's decisions in these relationships. The teacher tries to bring Ramachari into the "conventional way of life", but he errs and Ramachari's life is destroyed.

Almelu 
In college, Ramachari hangs out with Varada (Shivaram) and other friends. Varada has a very beautiful sister named Almelu. Almelu's beauty has maddened a neighbourhood hooligan, Jaleela (Ambareesh) who stalks her. Varada wants to put an end to this eve-teasing but he is timid. He asks Ramachari for help. Ramachari agrees when Varada tells him he'll get his sister Almelu married to Ramachari. Ramachari fights with Jaleela and drives him away. Almelu and Ramachari fall in love. Almelu's parents arrange for her marriage within their caste. When Almelu refuses the proposal and declares her love for Ramachari, Varada refuses support, denying any promise made to Ramachari. Teacher Chamayya intervenes and requests Ramachari to give up Almelu. He convinces Ramachari by making him understand that sacrifice is a greater act than selfish love. Ramachari, out of respect, agrees to his teacher and sacrifices his love. A few years later, Ramachari runs into Almelu at a five-star hotel, where she is a call-girl. Almelu's husband has forced her into a life of prostitution for money.

Margaret 
The second girl in Ramachari's life is Margaret, a peppy Christian girl. After Ramachari kisses Margaret on an ego tussle between the two she falls in love with him. After he is forced to give up Almelu, Ramachari starts responding to Margaret's advances. However, due to the intense pressure of the society which denounces the marriage between a Brahmin boy and a Christian girl, they decide to run away. Once again teacher Chamayya tries to stop Ramachari saying that sacrifice is greater than love. But this time, Ramachari confronts his teacher and says that he won't budge because the last time he sacrificed his love for Almelu, it went horribly wrong, as Almelu is now a high society call girl. Chamayya realizes perhaps for the first time that Ramachari is right and he himself was wrong.

Climax 
Chamayya falls to his death from the hill when Ramachari accidentally pushes him in a fit of rage for saying, "if you want to marry her, you have to witness my death before it." Ramachari, shocked by this incident, asks Margaret to join him in a bid to accompany his beloved teacher in death, to which she happily agrees and they both jump off the cliff. Ramachari, the hero is compared to a King Cobra. Dangerous, yet respected but a misfit in the society.

Other Key Characters

Chamayya Meshtru 
Chamayya (K. S. Ashwath) is the ever-supportive guardian of Ramachari who treats him as his own son. He is the only person able to control and have an influence over Ramachari. The movie focuses on a beautiful relationship with the teacher and student. In one emotional scene, Chamayya Meshtru accuses Ramachari of raping Almelu and then hits him with his walking stick, only to find out from Ramachari that it was a false allegation. The scene concludes with Ramachari tearfully saying, "Betha murdhogide, repairy madi tandkodteeni" and Chamayya Meshtru helplessly regretting his haste is a classic scene.

Jaleela 
Jaleela (Ambareesh) is the rowdy young man who teases Almelu every time she goes to college by singing the then-popular song " Mere sapnon ki Rani kab Ayegi tu". Almelu is fed complains to her brother Varda who turns to Ramachari for help. In a pivotal scene, Ramachari questions Varda as to why he should help his sister to which Varda promises to have Ramachari and Almelu married. This spurs on Ramachari who takes on Jaleela in a thrilling fight scene. The stakes are raised by the pailwan who promises the winner a garland. Ramachari wins and is rewarded with the promised garland. Jaleela asks for forgiveness and limps away even as Varda extracts his own little revenge.

Varada 
Varada (Shivaram) is a friend of Ramachari. He is usually known to be trying to find a speciality in someone and often uses that word in his dialogues. He is a key character who promises Almelu's hand in marriage to Ramachari, only to flip when he finds out that Ramachari is serious. He accuses Ramachari of raping Almelu. Ultimately, this results in Chamayya Meshtru intervening and have Almelu marry the man chosen by her parents.

Thungamma 
Thungamma (Leelavathi) is the wife of Chamayya meshtru, the doting foster mom of Ramachari. Their mother son equation is well depicted in the aftermath of ramachari tying his college principal to a pole and being made to apologize.

Cast 
 Vishnuvardhan as Ramachari
 Aarathi as Alamelu
 Shubha as Margaret
 Jayanthi as Onake Obavva (Special appearance)
 Ambareesh as Jaleela
 K. S. Ashwath as Chamayya Meshtru
 Leelavathi as wife of Chammayya Meshtru
 Pratima Devi as Alamelu's mother
 M. P. Shankar as Pailwan Basanna
 Shivaram as Alamelu's brother Varadha
 Lokanath as C. H. Shyam Rao, college principal
 Dheerendra Gopal as Thukaram, classmate of Ramachari
 Vajramuni as "Laxmu", a lawyer
 Shakti Prasad as Naidu uncle
 M. Jayashree as Ramachari's mother
 M. N. Lakshmi Devi as Margaret's mother

Soundtrack 
The music of the film was composed by Vijaya Bhaskar with lyrics penned by Vijaya Narasimha, Chi. Udaya Shankar and R. N. Jayagopal.

Two songs from this movie went on to be used in the Telugu version Kode Nagu – Sangama Sangama  was re-used as Sangamam Sangamam  and Kathe Heluve  was re-used as Katha Vinduva. The song Haavina Dwesha went on to be used in the Hindi version as Saanp Se Badhke. Vijayabhaskar reused "Karpoorada Gombe" as "Varavendum Vaazhkaiyil" for Tamil film Mayangugiral Oru Maadhu.

The song "Kannada Naadina" narrates the story of Onake Obavva who fought the forces of Hyder Ali.

Track List

Awards

21st Filmfare Awards South 
 Best Film – Kannada
 Special Award for excellent performance – Vishnuvardhan

1972–73 Karnataka State Film Awards 
 Second Best Film
 Best Actor – Vishnuvardhan
 Best Actress – Aarathi
 Best Supporting Actor – K. S. Ashwath
 Best Supporting Actress – Shubha
 Best Story – T. R. Subba Rao
 Best Screenplay – Puttanna Kanagal
 Best Dialogue – Chi. Udayashankar

Criticism 
After watching the film, T. R. Subba Rao remarked that Puttanna Kanagal has turned Naagarahaavu (the cobra) into 'Kerehaavu' (meaning rat snake). The implied meaning is that the characterisation of Ramachari in the novel and the movie is strikingly different and less effective. Nevertheless, Naagarahaavu is an all-time favorite movie and remains popular in all its reruns.

Remakes 
 This film was remade in Hindi titled as Zehreela Insaan, directed by Puttanna Kanagal himself.
 The film was remade in Tamil as Raja Nagam with Srikanth playing the lead role.
 This film was remade into Telugu titled Kode Nagu starring Sobhan Babu, Chandrakala and Lakshmi and noted lyricist Acharya Athreya. This was directed by K. S. Prakash Rao.
 The 2016 film Mr. and Mrs. Ramachari pays homage by loosely basing its plot on this film.

Trivia 
 "Baare Baare" was the first song in an Indian film to be fully shot in slow motion.
 T. R. Subba Rao had written his novel Naagarahaavu, based on painter Madhugiri Ramu & his teacher Shaamayya. Ramu was a gifted painter, whose paintings have adorned the North Gate of Mysore Palace.
 T. R. Subba Rao initially did not like the film version, which was based on his three novels, and criticized it.

References

External links 
 
 The Complete Index to World Film Since 1895
 Naagarahaavu songs lyrics

1970s Kannada-language films
1972 drama films
1972 films
Films based on Indian novels
Films based on multiple works
Films directed by Puttanna Kanagal
Films scored by Vijaya Bhaskar
Films shot in Chitradurga
Indian drama films
Kannada films remade in other languages